Telford's Change is a 1979 BBC television series by Brian Clark which stars Peter Barkworth. The theme music was composed and played by jazz composer John Dankworth.

Outline
Barkworth plays a bank manager, Mark Telford, who takes a backward step in his career in order to retreat from the rat race.  He relinquishes his job in international banking and becomes a local branch manager in Dover.

Telford's wife Laura (played by Hannah Gordon) and son Peter (Michael Maloney) remain in London. Keith Barron plays Tim Hart, Laura's theatrical colleague who is keen to have an affair with her, and with whom she does have a brief liaison. In order to win back his wife, Telford gives up the Dover job and returns to international banking.

The series was created and sold to the BBC by Barkworth himself and a group of colleagues (including Mark Shivas) through a company called Astramead.

Telford's Change consisted of only one series of ten episodes.

References

External links

1970s British drama television series
1979 British television series debuts
1979 British television series endings
BBC television dramas
English-language television shows